The mythological monster Medusa, her sisters, and the other Gorgons, have been featured in art and culture spanning from the days of ancient Greece to present day. Medusa has been variously portrayed as a monster, a protective symbol, a rallying symbol for liberty, and a sympathetic victim of rape and/or a curse.

She is perhaps best recognized by her hair of living snakes and  ability to turn living creatures to stone. Medusa is an ancient icon that remains one of the most popular and enduring figures of Greek mythology.  She continues to be recreated in pop culture and art, surpassing the popularity of many other mythological characters. Her likeness has been immortalized by artists including Leonardo da Vinci, Peter Paul Rubens, Caravaggio, Pablo Picasso, Auguste Rodin, and Benvenuto Cellini.

Ancient times to the Renaissance

The Gorgoneion, or Gorgon head, was used in the ancient world as a protective apotropaic symbol. Among the ancient Greeks, it was the most widely used symbol to avert evil. Medusa's head with its goggling eyes, fangs, and protruding tongue was depicted on the shield of Athena herself. Its use in this fashion was depicted in the Alexander Mosaic, a Roman mosaic (ca. 200 BC) in Pompeii. In some cruder representations, the blood flowing under the head can be mistaken for a beard.

By the Renaissance, artists depicted Medusa's head held aloft to represent the realistic human form of the triumphant hero Perseus (such as in the 1554 bronze statue Perseus with the Head of Medusa by Benvenuto Cellini). Medusa's head was also depicted to evoke horror by making the detached head the main subject (as demonstrated by the 1597 painting Medusa by Baroque painter Caravaggio).

19th century
After the French Revolution, Medusa was used as a popular emblem of Jacobinism and was often displayed as a figure of "French Liberty." This was in opposition to "English Liberty," which was personified by Athena (whose shield bore Medusa's head). "To radicals like Percy Bysshe Shelley, Medusa was an 'abject hero,' a victim of tyranny whose weakness, disfiguration, and monstrous mutilation [had] become, in themselves, a kind of revolutionary power." Shelley's 1819 poem, On the Medusa of Leonardo da Vinci in the Florentine Gallery was published posthumously by his wife Mary Shelley in 1824. Octave Mirbeau's use of Medusa during his time has also been examined.

Modern use
The image of Medusa's severed head has become one of the most-recognized images from Greek mythology. A representation of Perseus carrying this head has been featured on the cover of a number of paperback editions of Edith Hamilton's Mythology and several editions of Bulfinch's Mythology. Medusa also became a very popular icon in designer fashion, as the logo of the Italian luxury clothing brand Versace portrays a Gorgon head. Luciano Garbati's 2008 sculpture, Medusa with the Head of Perseus, portrays her clutching the severed head of Perseus, later becoming a feminist avatar for the MeToo movement.

Television and film

Medusa was portrayed as a wandering tree creature with a single glowing eye in Medusa Against the Son of Hercules (Perseus the Invincible) 1962, starring Richard Harrison. The creature effects were created by Carlo Rambaldi who later worked on Alien and E.T. The Extra-Terrestrial.

Medusa was a character in the film The Seven Faces of Dr. Lao.

The myth of the Gorgon was the basis for the 1964 Hammer horror film, The Gorgon, which "abandoned the traditional myth entirely and tried to tell a new story".

Medusa was a character in the 1981 film, Clash of the Titans. Special-effects creator Ray Harryhausen used stop motion animation to depict the battle with Medusa. Although "the essential story sticks closer to its sources than any other interpretation", the film takes creative liberties as Medusa's biology differs from "any previous representations, ancient or modern", with the lower body of a snake rather than legs. Medusa is also featured in the 2010 remake of the film, with a more human face that contorts when she turns her victims to stone.

Duzer is a Gorgon in the 1990 animated series, Gravedale High.

Medusa appears in the film, Percy Jackson & the Olympians: The Lightning Thief (played by Uma Thurman), where she attacks Percy Jackson and his friends as they are looking for the Pearl of Persephone in her garden (which has statues: people she has turned to stone). When Percy's friends drive a car through a wall Medusa is distracted and Percy decapitates her before escaping. The trio then keeps Medusa's head, using it to kill the Hydra. In a mid-credits scene, Percy's abusive step-father Gabe Ugliano finds Medusa's severed head in the refrigerator and is turned to stone.

In the anime series Beyblade: Metal Fusion, Reiji Mizuchi, one of the antagonists of Metal Fusion, owns the Beyblade Poison Serpent, which originally is based on a Cobra, but when in Attack mode, is based on Medusa. In the follow-up series Metal Masters, Julian Konzern's Beyblade, Gravity Destroyer (or Gravity Perseus in the Japanese dub of Metal Masters, is originally based on the Greek god Perseus, but when in Counter mode, it is based on Medusa and it freezes it's opponents to stone when this happens.

Medusa (played by Jemima Rooper) appears in the BBC One series Atlantis before she became a Gorgon.

In the film Miss Peregrine's Home for Peculiar Children, the two masked twins' "peculiarity" is revealed to be that they are Gorgons, with serpentine faces and the ability to petrify.

In the Netflix series, Chilling Adventures of Sabrina, there is a Gorgon character named Nagaina. She turned the seer Rosalind and the Witch Dorcas into stone, they were later turned back into flesh and Rosalind beheaded Nagaina with a sword.

In the 2018 version of Charmed, Medusa is summoned to punish members of a fraternity for slutshaming a girl. Instead of killing her, one of the protagonists sympathizes with her pain as a rape victim which convinces Medusa to undo her damage. 

In the 2022 Netflix series Wednesday, a group of students attending Nevermore Academy, a private school for monstrous outcasts, are gorgons. The group includes male students, and they only change people to stone when their snakes are uncovered. One gorgon accidentally temporarily turns himself to stone upon seeing himself getting out of the shower.  

In the 18th episode of the animated series The Real Adventures of Jonny Quest, an avatar of Medusa (voiced by Frank Welker) was created by Dr. Jeremiah Surd in an attempt to guard the remains of a statue to Apollo in the virtual world.

Medusa appears as the Rider class Servant in the anime adaptations of Fate/Stay Night, voiced by Yū Asakawa. There she is the Servant of Sakura Matou, but is loaned to her brother Shinji when she is unwilling to fight.

Medusa and her sisters Euryale and Stheno can be seen in the Class of the Titans episode “Sibling Rivalry”, with Medusa, after returning to freedom after her 1000-year banishment, turning a zoo's grizzly bear into a stone statue just as the grizzly bear was about to attack while standing up while roaring with his right arm raised and his left arm lowered. It is stated that those who were turned into stone die and are forever statues.
 
In an Amazon Prime advertisement Medusa (played by Jesi Le Rae) is depicted buying new sunglasses through the service in order to show off her fun side.

Episode 4 of Series 1 of The Powerpuff girls cartoon ("Mummy Fearest" ) features a villainess called Sedusa, who has prehensile locks of hair. She initially appears as a love interest for the Professor and adoptive mother to the girls under her alias "Ima Goodlady".

Video games
Medusa and her Gorgon sisters, as well as creatures inspired by them, have been featured in gaming since the advent of role-playing games (RPGs), from Dungeons and Dragons, to God of War, to Final Fantasy.

Medusa is the primary antagonist in the Nintendo Entertainment System game Kid Icarus and the earlier levels of the Nintendo 3DS game Kid Icarus: Uprising.

Medusa appears as a recurring enemy in the Castlevania series.

Medusa appears in Assassin's Creed Odyssey, where she is implied to be a human that has been transformed by the effects of the Apple of Eden.

Gorgons appear as enemies in the 2006 game Titan Quest.

In the Fate/stay night visual novel, Medusa appears as the Rider-class servant in her pre-transformation human form. Later installments of the franchise expand on her and introduce her sisters. In the Fate franchise's fictional universe, the three sisters were originally worshipped as chthonic deities before being exiled to their island by rival cults. Rumors of her monstrous nature eventually transformed Medusa against her will into the Gorgon, who then devoured Stheno and Euryale.

Medusa is also a hero in Dota 2.

Medusa is a playable character in Smite, turning enemy gods into stone.

Music
Thrash metal band Anthrax (American band) dedicates a song to Medusa on their album Spreading The Disease.

Annie Lennox (of Eurythmics fame), titled her UK no.1, 2nd solo album Medusa. An album of cover-tunes, which contains no songs named Medusa.

British band UB40 produced a song ("Madame Medusa") for their 1980 album, Signing Off, drawing unfavorable comparisons between the mythological monster and United Kingdom Prime Minister Margaret Thatcher.

Sidhu Moose Wala used photo of Medusa in the Intro of his album MooseTape.

Whitney Avalon released a song in 2020 titled 'Plaything of The Gods', written from Medusa's point of view.

Heather Dale's 2005 album "The Road to Santiago" included the song "Medusa," also from Medusa's point of view.

Another song named "Medusa" was released by Kailee Morgue in 2017.

Books
Author Skevi Philippou wrote Medusa, through the eyes of the Gorgon in 2010.

Medusa appears in The Lightning Thief where, having reformed following her defeat at Perseus' hands thousands of years earlier, Medusa faces off against Percy Jackson and his friends. Much like the original Perseus, Percy decapitates Medusa before he sends her head to the gods as a gift. Poseidon later returns Medusa's head to Percy and it is used by his mother Sally to kill her abusive husband Gabe Ugliano. In the second book of the sequel series, The Son of Neptune, Percy is attacked by Stheno and Euryale, who want revenge for their sister's death. 

In Monster Musume, the Medusa is a subspecies of Lamia.

The 2016 novella Here, the world entire, by Anwen Kya Hayward, is a reimagining of the Medusa and Perseus myth, exploring Medusa's reflection about the events leading to her transformation, her centuries of solitary captivity and her self-doubting when first meeting Perseus.

The 2022 book Stone Blind by Natalie Haynes is a retelling of the Medusa legend from multiple persepctives. The New York Times reviewer wrote, "the novel substitutes action-adventure for feminist tragedy, a point made clear in the opening pages. 'This particular monster is assaulted, abused and vilified. And yet, as the story is always told, she is the one you should fear,' Haynes announces in her fierce yet conversational style. 'We’ll see about that.'”

Dance
Choreographer Sidi Larbi Cherkaoui created a one-act ballet titled Medusa for The Royal Ballet, with Natalia Osipova originating the title role. The ballet premiered in 2019.

Toys
In Monster High, Deuce Gorgon is the son of Medusa, while Viperine Gorgon is the daughter of Stheno.

References

Medusa
Medusa

Greek legendary creatures